Ryan Nall (born December 27, 1995) is an American football fullback who is a free agent. He played college football at Oregon State.

Early years
Nall was raised by his mother and father (Teri and Fred) with four siblings (two half-brothers, one brother, and one sister). He attended Central Catholic High School in Portland, Oregon, where he played high school football for the Rams. 

As a senior, he rushed for 1,684 yards and 22 touchdowns, leading Central Catholic to their first state title in 60 years. He was named the Oregon Sports Awards Prep Football Player of the Year. Along with football, he also played basketball. On August 10, 2013, he committed to play football for the Oregon State Beavers, choosing it over Portland State and Wyoming.

College career
Nall did not play as a true freshman in 2014 and chose to redshirt. As a redshirt freshman in 2015, Nall played in 11 games, rushing for 455 yards on 73 carries, scoring three touchdowns. He also caught seven passes for 109 yards.

In 2016, he appeared in 10 games, missing two due to injury. He finished the year with 951 rushing yards and 13 touchdowns on 147 carries along with 214 receiving yards on 22 receptions with two total touchdowns.

As a redshirt junior in 2017, he played in 11 games, rushing for 810 yards and eight touchdowns on 165 carries along with catching 27 passes for 240 yards and two touchdowns. After the season, he declared for the 2018 NFL Draft. 

Nall ranks eighth in Oregon State history with 2,216 rushing yards.

College statistics

Professional career

Chicago Bears
Nall signed with the Chicago Bears as an undrafted free agent on May 10, 2018. He was waived on September 1, 2018 and was signed to the practice squad the next day. He signed a reserve/future contract with the Bears on January 8, 2019.

On August 31, 2019, Nall was cut and signed to the practice squad the next day. He was promoted to the active roster on November 9. He recorded his first career carry in the 2019 finale against the Minnesota Vikings with a seven-yard gain.

Nall scored his first professional touchdown on a six-yard reception in Week 9 of the 2020 season against the Tennessee Titans in the 24–17 loss. He signed a contract extension with the team on March 3, 2021. He was waived on August 31, 2021 and re-signed to the practice squad the next day. He was promoted to the active roster on October 10, 2021.

Dallas Cowboys
On April 8, 2022, Nall signed with the Dallas Cowboys. He was sidelined most of training camp with a shoulder injury. He was waived/injured on August 15, 2022 and placed on injured reserve. He was released on August 23.

References

External links
 
Oregon State Beavers bio

1995 births
Living people
Players of American football from Oregon
People from Clackamas, Oregon
Sportspeople from the Portland metropolitan area
Central Catholic High School (Portland, Oregon) alumni
American football running backs
Oregon State Beavers football players
Chicago Bears players
Dallas Cowboys players